Padgampora, also known as Padgampur, is a village in Awantipora tehsil in Pulwama district of Indian adminestered Jammu and Kashmir. It is located  towards East from District headquarters Pulwama.  from Tral. 25 km from State capital Srinagar.

Demographics 
 India census, Padgampora had a population of 6,250. Males constitute 59% of the population and females 41%. Padgampora has an average literacy rate of 71.3%, higher than the national average of 59.5%; with 65.1% of the males and 48.8% of females literate. 14.6% of the population is under 6 years of age.

Schools in padgampora 

 Mount View Public school
 Al-Amaan International school
 Govt High school
 Govt middle school Dangerpora
 Govt Primary school 
 Govt primary school zadipora padgampora

Nearest colleges and universities 

 Islamic University of Science and Technology
 AIIMS Awantipora
 Syed Mantaqi Memorial College of Nursing & Medical Technology Awantipora
 Govt degree college awantipora
 Govt polytechnic college Pulwama

Connectivity 
 Railway station 1 km (Awantipora railway station)
 Highway 0.5 km National Highway 44 (India)
 Airport 22 km  (Srinagar International Airport)
 Air base 1.5 km  (Awantipur Air Force Station)

See also 
 Anantnag
 Martand Sun Temple
 Charsoo Awantipora

References

External links
 Funeral of Irshad Ganie (Lashkar Divisional Commander)
 Clashes in padgampora (Greater kashmir)

Villages in Pulwama district